Ann Lewis is American political advisor.

Ann or Anne Lewis may also refer to:

In arts and media
Ann Lewis (musician) (born 1956), Japanese singer
Ann Lewis (artist), multidisciplinary activist artist
Ann Lewis Hamilton, American television producer and writer
Anne Lewis (novelist) from Honno
Anne Lewis (writer); see Tir na n-Og Award
Anne Lewis Johnson from POV

Others
Ann Lewis (barrel racer), world champion barrel racer
Ann Clwyd (born 1937), née Lewis, politician
Anna Lewis (suffragette), British suffragette awarded the Hunger Strike Medal

Fiction
Anne Lewis, a character in the Robocop franchise portrayed by Nancy Allen

See also
Lewis (surname)